The , or Copal, is a Japanese manufacturer of optical, electronic and mechanical equipment, primarily for the photographic industry.  It has been a subsidiary of Nidec Corporation since 1998, and was formerly known as the Copal Corporation. The company began operation in 1946, with small-scale production of photographic shutters; these are still one of the company's best-known products.

In the 1960s the company began producing the well-known Copal Square vertically travelling metal blade focal plane shutter, which was very successful and was used in cameras by many prominent manufacturers.

The Copal Square-S, for example used in the Konica T3s (1973-1978) and the Nikkormat FT, is very reliable. It works over a wide temperature range. The electronically controlled Copal Square E (1968) was used in the Yashica TL Electro X, the Canon EF, the Nikkormat EL. For Minolta XE and the Leica R3 the Copal-Leitz Shutter CLS was developed in 1972. For the professional Nikon F4 built 1988 until 1996 the Copal Square was developed and  reached 1/8000 s and 1/250 s with flash.

In 2020 Nidec Copal has round about 6,450 employees and manufactures devices, that are used in automobiles, optical products and Tablets beside shutters for digital cameras.

References

External links 

Manufacturing companies of Japan
Photography companies of Japan